Nitrogen triiodide is an inorganic compound with the formula NI3. It is an extremely sensitive contact explosive: small quantities explode with a loud, sharp snap when touched even lightly, releasing a purple cloud of iodine vapor; it can even be detonated by alpha radiation. NI3 has a complex structural chemistry that is difficult to study because of the instability of the derivatives. Although nitrogen is more electronegative than iodine, the compound was so named due to its analogy to the compound nitrogen trichloride.

Structure of NI3 and its derivatives
Nitrogen triiodide was first characterized by Raman spectroscopy in 1990 when it was prepared by an ammonia-free route. Boron nitride reacts with iodine monofluoride in trichlorofluoromethane at −30 °C to produce pure NI3 in low yield:

BN + 3 IF → NI3 + BF3

NI3 is pyramidal (C3v molecular symmetry), as are the other nitrogen trihalides and ammonia.

The material that is usually called "nitrogen triiodide" is prepared by the reaction of iodine with ammonia. When this reaction is conducted at low temperatures in anhydrous ammonia, the initial product is NI3 · (NH3)5, but this material loses some ammonia upon warming to give the 1:1 adduct NI3 · NH3. This adduct was first reported by Bernard Courtois in 1812, and its formula was finally determined in 1905 by Oswald Silberrad. Its solid state structure consists of chains of -NI2-I-NI2-I-NI2-I-. Ammonia molecules are situated between the chains. When kept cold in the dark and damp with ammonia, NI3 · NH3 is stable.

Decomposition and explosiveness

The instability of NI3 and NI3 · NH3 can be attributed to the large steric strain caused by the three large iodine atoms being held in proximity to each other around the relatively tiny nitrogen atom. This results in a very low activation energy for its decomposition, a reaction made even more favorable due to the great stability of N2. Nitrogen triiodide has no practical commercial value due to its extreme shock sensitivity, making it impossible to store, transport, and utilize for controlled explosions. Whereas pure nitroglycerin is powerful and also greatly shock-sensitive (although not nearly as much so as nitrogen triiodide, which can be set off with the touch of a feather), it was only due to phlegmatizers that nitroglycerin's shock sensitivity was reduced and it became safer to handle and transport in the form of dynamite.

The decomposition of NI3 proceeds as follows to give nitrogen gas and iodine:
2 NI3 (s) → N2 (g) + 3 I2 (g) (−290 kJ/mol)

However, the dry material is a contact explosive, decomposing approximately as follows:
 8 NI3 · NH3 → 5 N2 + 6 NH4I + 9 I2

Consistent with this equation, these explosions leave orange-to-purple stains of iodine, which can be removed with sodium thiosulfate solution. An alternate method of stain removal is to simply allow the iodine time to sublime.
Small amounts of nitrogen triiodide are sometimes synthesized as a demonstration to high school chemistry students or as an act of "chemical magic." To highlight the sensitivity of the compound, it is usually detonated by touching it with a feather, but even the slightest air current, laser light, or other movement can cause detonation. Nitrogen triiodide is also notable for being the only known chemical explosive that detonates when exposed to alpha particles and nuclear fission products.

References

External links
See the explosion
Nitrogen Tri-Iodide – explains why the compound is explosive
Nitrogen Tri-Iodide Detonation on Youtube

Inorganic amines
Iodides
Nitrogen halides
Explosive chemicals
Pyrotechnic chemicals